Amrita College of Engineering & Technology (ACET), formerly Sun College of Engineering, is an engineering college located in Nagercoil in Kanyakumari district, Tamil Nadu, India. It was established by the ACP education trust, Nagercoil in 1999. It was acquired by Amrita Institutions and renamed in 2018. The college is managed by Mata Amritanandamayi Math

Campus

List of institutions
The institute contains an engineering college, a polytechnic college and a college of education (Co- Education). The college of engineering is approved by AICTE, New Delhi and affiliated to Anna University, Chennai offering five full-time undergraduate and two full-time postgraduate engineering programmes and management studies to students. BE/BTech admissions for Govt. quota seats are filled as per government of Tamil Nadu norms through TNEA(Tamil Nadu Engineering Admissions) counselling conducted by the Anna University and the management quota seats are filled through regulated management seat procedures done by the Consortium of Private Self Financing Arts, Science and Engineering Colleges.  In every course, 65% of the seats are filled through counselling and 35% of the seats by management quota.

See also
Education in India
Literacy in India
List of institutions of higher education in Tamil Nadu

References

External links
 

Private engineering colleges in Tamil Nadu
Colleges affiliated to Anna University
Universities and colleges in Kanyakumari district
Educational institutions established in 1999
1999 establishments in Tamil Nadu

Universities and colleges affiliated with the Mata Amritanandamayi Math